Mojsije I Rajović was the Archbishop of Peć and Serbian Patriarch, head of the Serbian Orthodox Church, from 1712 to 1725, with seat in the Patriarchal Monastery of Peć.

Before he became the Serbian Patriarch, Mojsije served as Metropolitan of Raška, from 1704, under Patriarch Kalinik I. That was traditionally a very prominent position, so when the next Patriarch Atanasije I died in 1712, Mojsije was elected as his successor. His seat was in the Patriarchal Monastery of Peć.

During the Austro-Turkish War (1716-1718), Belgrade was liberated from Ottoman rule together with northern parts of Serbia and Temes Banat. In those regions new ecclesiastical province for Orthodox Serbs in Habsburg Monarchy was formed, known as the Metropolitanate of Belgrade. It was headed by metropolitan Mojsije Petrović, who received blessings and confirmation from Patriarch Mojsije. New autonomous Metropolitanate of Belgrade had jurisdiction over Kingdom of Serbia and Temes Banat.

By 1725, patriarch Mojsije decided, under the burden of old age and poor health, to transfer his authority to the Metropolitan of Raška, named Arsenije, who became new Serbian Patriarch. After abdication from the patriarchal throne, he spent the rest of his days in the Patriarchal Monastery of Peć and died there on 13 April 1726.

References

Sources

External links
 Official site of the Serbian Orthodox Church: Serbian Archbishops and Patriarchs

Mojsije I
Eastern Orthodox Christians from Serbia
18th-century Eastern Orthodox bishops
18th-century Serbian people
Serbs from the Ottoman Empire
1726 deaths